History of the Armenians may refer to:

the history of Armenia
History of the Armenians, a book by pseudo-Agathangelos
History of the Armenians, alternative title of History of Armenia (book) by Movses Khorenatsi